Jillian M. Buriak FRSC is a Canadian chemist, currently a Canada Research Chair in Nanomaterials at University of Alberta and a Fellow of the Royal Society of Canada, American Association for the Advancement of Science (AAAS) and Royal Society of Chemistry. She is known for her work developing flexible, lightweight solar cells made from nanoparticles. By spraying a plastic surface with nanomaterials, she's able to fabricate a transparent layer of electrode that acts as solar cells. Due to the flexibility, they could be incorporated onto different surfaces.

She has an A.B. degree from Harvard University (1990) and a Ph.D. from Université Louis Pasteur (1995), Strasbourg, working on organometallic chemistry and catalysis. She held a postdoctoral appointment at the Scripps Research Institute at La Jolla, California, working on self-assembly of nanostructures on surfaces. Buriak started her independent faculty career at Purdue University in 1997, was promoted to associate professor, with tenure, in 2001. In 2003, she joined the University of Alberta as a full professor.

From 2003 to 2008, Buriak was on the Board of Reviewing Editors (BoRE) at Science (handling 7-10 papers per week). She was an associate editor at ACS Nano from 2009 to 2013 (handling >500 papers per year). In 2014, she was appointed as the editor-in-chief of Chemistry of Materials handling ~5000 papers per year.

Selected honors 

2009: Fellow of the Royal Society of Canada
2009: Fellow of the American Association for the Advancement of Science
2005: Rutherford Memorial Medal (Chemistry) of the Royal Society of Canada
Canada Research Chair of Nanomaterials
Canada's Top 40 Under 40
ACS Pure Chemistry Award
Camille Dreyfus Teacher-Scholar Award
Fresenius Award
Cottrell Teacher-Scholar

Research interests 

 Materials for Energy
 Nanomaterials Synthesis
 Silicon Surface Chemistry
 Block Copolymer Self Assembly

References

External links

Year of birth missing (living people)
Living people
Academic staff of the University of Alberta
Canadian chemists
Women chemists
Canadian nanotechnologists
Harvard University alumni
University of Strasbourg alumni
Fellows of the Royal Society of Canada
Fellows of the Royal Society of Chemistry
Fellows of the American Association for the Advancement of Science
Place of birth missing (living people)
Academic journal editors
Purdue University faculty